Snow Peak Wildlife Management Area at  is an Idaho wildlife management area in Shoshone County.

Snow Peak has significant populations of mountain goats and elk as well as other species less common in Idaho, such as pileated woodpeckers and northern goshawks.

References

Protected areas established in 1989
Protected areas of Shoshone County, Idaho
Wildlife management areas of Idaho
1989 establishments in Idaho